The New Adventures of Aladdin (original title: Les Nouvelles Aventures d'Aladin) is a 2015 French comedy film directed by Arthur Benzaquen and starring Kev Adams. A sequel, Alad'2, was released on October 3, 2018.

Plot
On Christmas Eve, Sam and Khaled are disguised as Santa in the Galeries Lafayette, hoping to steal all that fall under their nose. Unfortunately for him, Sam is stuck with children aged between 6 and 10 years and they ask him to tell them a story. Initially he refuses but when the floor manager insists, he tells the story of Aladdin in his own way. Main characters of the story are a representation of people in his real life. His desire to be a rapper, traveler and rich is incorporated with the children's fantasy requests in the story. In the end he decides to not to steal and as Aladdin he owns who he is with his wife, that he is not an financier or someone who does philanthropic work. but a simple person who loves her dearly and broke.

Cast
 Kev Adams as Aladin / Sam
 William Lebghil as Khaled
 Jean-Paul Rouve as The Vizier
Vanessa Guide as Princess Shallia / Sofia
 Audrey Lamy as Rababa / Barbara
 Arthur Benzaquen as The Magician
 Éric Judor as The Genius
 Michel Blanc as The Sultan
 Ramzy Bedia as Balouad
 La Fouine as The Deceitful
 Cyril Hanouna as Radio Voice
 Michael Cohen as The Twin Brother
 Youssef Hajdi as Cheik Loukoums
 Ali Karamoko as Kamel Toe

Sequel
A sequel, Alad'2, was confirmed in August 2017.

Alad'2, was released on October 3, 2018.

References

External links
 

2015 films
French comedy films
2010s French-language films
2015 comedy films
Pathé films
2010s French films